Breath of God is an independently released album by Todd Agnew. The album was recorded in 2001 live at The Journey in Alvin, TX. The album also features the songs "Breath of God", "Awesome God" (Rich Mullins), and "Romans 12:1" which would later appear on Agnew's second studio album Grace Like Rain.

Track listing 
 "Romans 12:1"
 "Trading My Sorrows"
 "Awesome God"
 "Open the Eyes of My Heart"
 "You O God"
 "In the Light"
 "In the Secret"
 "You Are My God"
 "Breath of God"
 "Create In Me"
 "If I Could Just Sit with You Awhile"
 "Honestly"
 "More Faithful Than I"
 "Sweet Spirit"

Musicians 

Brian Wilson - Drums (Tracks 8-14)
Lance Higdon: Drums (Tracks 1-7)
Nathan Bell: Bass
Joel Stretch: Acoustic Guitar
Nick Ostraw: Electric Guitar
Shauna Couri: Vocals and Keyboard
Kelli Couri: Vocal

External links

The Todd Agnew Forums
Gracenote

2001 live albums
Todd Agnew albums